Thomas Slidell (c.1807 – April 20, 1864) was chief justice of the Louisiana Supreme Court.

He was a brother of John Slidell, a diplomat of the Confederate States of America in France.

He entered Yale College from New York and graduated in 1825. He was the United States Attorney for the Eastern District of Louisiana from 1837 to 1838. He was an associate justice of the Louisiana Supreme Court for several years subsequent to 1847, and in 1855 he was appointed Chief Justice of the State.

Having resigned his position on the bench, he went to Europe in 1856, for the purpose of recruiting his health, which had been impaired for a year or two, in consequence of his excessive professional labor. While abroad, mental disease developed itself, he was brought back to this country to become a
patient of the Butler Hospital, in Providence, Rhode Island. During the winter of 1862-3, the cloud lifted, and in most respects his perceptions became quite clear and correct; and in April, 1863, he rejoined his family, who were residing in Newport, Rhode Island, and there he remained until his death, April 20, 1864, aged 57 years.

He left a widow, (formerly Miss Callender) and a son who was an officer in the national army.

External links
Thomas Slidell in the Louisiana Historical Association's Dictionary of Louisiana Biography

The Political Graveyard

1864 deaths
Chief Justices of the Louisiana Supreme Court
United States Attorneys for the Eastern District of Louisiana
Yale University alumni
Year of birth uncertain